Handley Page Transport Ltd was an airline company founded in 1919, soon after the end of the First World War, by Frederick Handley Page.

The company's first planes were Handley Page Type O/400 bombers modified for passenger use. They flew a London-Paris route. Per a request from the Air Ministry, the Handley Page Type W8 was later used for flights to both Paris and Brussels.

On 31 March 1924 the assets and operations of Handley were merged with three other British airlines to found Imperial Airways. That company remained dormant until reconstituted to take over operations for Miles Aircraft in 1947 as Handley Page (Reading) Ltd.

The world's first in-flight meal was offered by Handley Page Transport.

Cricklewood Aerodrome 

Cricklewood Aerodrome was adjacent to the Handley Page factory in Cricklewood, which had been established in 1912. The airfield was used by the factory and the transport company.

Until 17 February 1920 Handley Page Transport used Hounslow Heath Aerodrome to embark and disembark passengers for customs clearance, as customs facilities were not provided at Cricklewood initially. A London-Paris air service from Cricklewood Aerodrome was inaugurated in 1920.

The aerodrome closed in 1929 due to suburban development, and the Golders Green Estate was built on the site. A new aerodrome was built at Radlett, where most aircraft were then constructed. At Cricklewood construction of aircraft continued until 1964, when the premises were sold to become the Cricklewood trading estate.

Accidents and incidents
On 14 December 1920 a Handley Page O/400 used by the airline crashed on take-off from Cricklewood Aerodrome, hitting a tree; both crew and two of the six passengers died.

On 14 January 1922, the Handley Page Transport Handley Page O/10 G-EATN, operating on a scheduled passenger flight from Croydon Airport in London to Paris–Le Bourget Airport outside Paris, crashed while on approach to Le Bourget; all five people on board died.

See also
 List of defunct airlines of the United Kingdom

References

External links
Photos of inaugural London-Paris service, 1920 
Heritage Locations – Cricklewood Aerodrome

Airlines established in 1919
1919 establishments in England
Defunct airlines of the United Kingdom
Handley Page